The House at 34 Benefit Street in Southbridge, Massachusetts is a modest factory worker's cottage built by the American Optical Company during a period of its expansion in the 1870s.  After opening its new Main Plant in The Flats section of Southbridge, workers began to migrate there from the Globe Village neighborhood, increasing demand for housing in that area.  It is a narrow -story wood-frame structure, which has some architectural style despite its simplicity.  The styling is basically Italianate in influence, with wide eaves, and a porch with decorative posts, balustrade, and brackets.

The house was listed on the National Register of Historic Places in 1989.

See also
National Register of Historic Places listings in Southbridge, Massachusetts
National Register of Historic Places listings in Worcester County, Massachusetts

References

External links
 34 Benefit Street MACRIS Listing

Houses completed in 1870
Houses in Southbridge, Massachusetts
National Register of Historic Places in Southbridge, Massachusetts
Houses on the National Register of Historic Places in Worcester County, Massachusetts
1870 establishments in Massachusetts